Randy Johnson is an American attorney and politician who served as a member of the Hennepin County Board of Commissioners from 1979 to 2017.

Education 
Johnson earned a Bachelor of Arts degree in political science from Macalester College and a Juris Doctor from the University of Minnesota Law School.

Career 
First elected in 1978, Johnson was re-elected to seven consecutive terms. He is the longest-serving commissioner since the county's founding in 1852. Johnson announced he would not seek reelection in the summer of 2016.

During his tenure, Johnson represented all or portions of the suburban cities of Bloomington, Chanhassen, Eden Prairie and Richfield.

Johnson served as chair of the county board of commissioners in 2008. He previously chaired the county board from 1997 through 2000, and from 2004 through 2007.

Jonhson served as a member of the Federal Geographic Data Committee.

References

External links
Hennepin County Commissioner Randy Johnson Biography
Commissioner Johnson Speeches

County commissioners in Minnesota
Year of birth missing (living people)
Living people
Macalester College alumni
Minnesota Republicans
People from Bloomington, Minnesota
University of Minnesota Law School alumni
South High School (Minnesota) alumni